Oh Se-hoon is a Korean name. Notable people with the name include:

 Oh Se-hoon (born 1961), South Korean politician and three-term mayor of Seoul
 Oh Se-hun (born 1994), member of South Korean boy band Exo
 Oh Se-hun (footballer) (born 1999), South Korean football player